Motyčky is a village and municipality in Banská Bystrica District in the Banská Bystrica Region of central Slovakia.

History
In historical records the village was first mentioned in 1743.

Geography
The municipality lies at an altitude of 678 metres and covers an area of 13.082 km2. It has a population of about 98 people.

Villages and municipalities in Banská Bystrica District